

Qualification system
For the first time, weightlifting athletes had to qualify for the Games. A total of 226 weightlifters (120 male and 106 women) will qualify to compete at the games. Per the regulations each country may only enter one athlete per event for a total of 16 athletes (eight per gender). The host nation (Australia) is permitted to enter one athlete per event. The 2017 Commonwealth champion will also qualify. The next 12 spots (5 for the heaviest two women's categories) are awarded using the Commonwealth Rankings (from 24 October 2016 – 31 October 2017). Finally one spot is reserved for a wildcard per category.

Summary

Men

56 kg

62 kg

69 kg

77 kg

85 kg

94 kg

105 kg

+105 kg

Women

48 kg

Only 11 athletes were eligible through the rankings. It is unknown if the last spot will be reallocated to the invitations. 
New Zealand rejected its quota.

53 kg

58 kg

63 kg

69 kg

75 kg

90 kg

+90 kg

References

External links
Men's Commonwealth Rankings
Women's Commonwealth Rankings

2017 in weightlifting
Weightlifting at the 2018 Commonwealth Games